Naro-Fominsky District is an administrative and municipal district (raion), one of the thirty-six in Moscow Oblast, Russia. It is located in the southwest of the oblast. Its administrative center is the town of Naro-Fominsk. Population: 189,763 (2010 Census);  The population of Naro-Fominsk accounts for 34.1% of the district's total population.

A part of Naro-Fominsky District was merged into the federal city of Moscow on July 1, 2012.

The oldest building in the district is the Kamenskoye Church.

References

Notes

Sources

Districts of Moscow Oblast
